The Color Purple: Music From the Motion Picture is the soundtrack album to the film of the same name released in November 1986 by Qwest Records. It consists of an original score composed by Quincy Jones and original songs performed by various artists.

The score of the film combines elements of classical and period jazz, blues, and gospel, and features several popular songs of the 1880s.

Critical reception and accolades

The soundtrack to the Color Purple garnered positive reviews from music critics. It was praised for its production and Táta Vega's vocal performance with Vega featured on four songs from the album. The song, "Miss Celie's Blues (Sister)", is sung by the character Shug Avery, played by Margaret Avery in the film but whose singing voice is dubbed by Vega.

Music from the film was nominated for two Academy Awards: Best Original Score and Best Original Song. The soundtrack peaked at number 55 on the Billboard Top R&B Albums chart.

Single 
"Miss Celie's Blues (Sister)" by Táta Vega was released as a single to support the album. It was composed in a blues/ragtime style.

Track listing

Disc 1
 Overture - 7:56
 Celie Leaves With Mr. - 3:22
 Corrine and Olivia - 3:06
 Nettie Teaches Celie - 4:22
 The Separation - 2:53
Celie and Harpo Grow Up/ - 2:43
 Careless Love - 0:56
 Sophia Leaves Harpo - 2:39
 Celie Cooks Shug Breakfas - 1:24
Junk Bucket Blues (78 RPM) - 1:48
 The Dirty Dozens - 3:13
 Miss Celie's Blues (Sister) - 2:29
 Don't Make Me No Never Mi -3:05
 My Heart (Will Always Lea) - 1:38
 Three On the Road - 0:25
 Bus Pulls Out - 0:51

Disc 2 (Score Album)

 The First Letter - 5:04
 Letter Search - 3:08
 Nettie's Letters - 0:59
 High Life / Proud Theme - 1:08
 J.B. King - 0:38
 Heaven Belongs to You - 1:02
 Katutoka Corrine - 1:01
 Celie Shaves Mr./ Scarif - 3:13
 I'm Here - 1:51
 Champagne Train - 2:36
 Celie's New House/ Body - 4:13
 Maybe God Is Tryin' to Tell You Something - 4:38
 Reunion / Finale - 4:37

References

1986 soundtrack albums
1980s film soundtrack albums
Quincy Jones soundtracks
Qwest Records soundtracks